The Cairo Conservatoire (transliteration: Ma'had el-Konservatwar; full name: "المعهد العالي للموسيقى "الكونســرفاتوار) is the primary music conservatory in Egypt. It was established in 1959 and is located in the same building complex as the Cinema Institute and the Higher Institute for Theatrical Arts, Haram, Giza, Greater Cairo, while the Cairo Symphony Orchestra is based at Cairo Opera House in Cairo.

Along with six other educational institutions, the Cairo Conservatoire is part of Egypt's Academy of Arts (Akādīmīya al-Finūn), a large complex.

The current dean is dr.Hanan Aboulmagd.

The Cairo Conservatoire was preceded by, but should not be confused with, several other smaller Cairo institutions with similar names, such as the conservatoires of Ignaz Tiegerman and Joseph Szulc.

They teach piano, violin, and all other instruments.

Notable faculty
Samha El-Kholy
Nabila Erian
Mohamed Abdelwahab Abdelfattah

Alumni
Mona Ghoneim (composer)
Ali Osman
Ahmed Badr
Nabila Erian (singer)
Ramzi Yassa (pianist)
Mohamed Abdelwahab Abdelfattah
Mahmoud Saleh (cellist)
Ines Abdel-Dayem (flute)

References

Education in Cairo
Music schools in Egypt
Educational institutions established in 1959
Culture in Cairo
1959 establishments in Egypt